CM or its variants may refer to:

Arts and media

Gaming
 Championship Manager, a popular football management simulation game
 Chessmaster, a chess computer program series

Music
 C minor, abbreviated Cm, a minor scale or chord based on C
 CM (school), a youth and community music organisation
 Classical music, Western art music
 Common metre, abbreviated CM, a poetic metre frequently used in hymns

Other media
 Correio da Manhã, a Portuguese daily newspaper

Science and technology

Computing 
 Configuration management, a systems engineering process for establishing and maintaining consistency
 Connection Machine, series of supercomputers
 Content management, technologies that support the collection, management, and publishing of information
 CyanogenMod, alternative firmware for Android phones, rebranded as LineageOS

Medicine 

 Centromedian nucleus, a part of the thalamus
 Chiari malformation, a narrowing of the skull which puts pressure on the cerebellum
 Chylomicron, lipoprotein with extremely low density
 Contingency management, a type of treatment where patients are rewarded (or, less often, punished) for their behavior

Physics and chemistry
 Cm, the pitching moment coefficient in aerodynamics
 Curium, symbol Cm, a chemical element

Units of measure
 Centimetre (cm), a unit of length equal to one hundredth of a metre
 Coulomb-metre (Cm), SI unit of electrical dipole moment
 Centimorgan (cM), a unit for measuring genetic linkage

Other uses in science and technology 
 CM Draconis, an eclipsing binary system in the constellation of Draco
 Apollo command module, a segment of the Apollo command and service module
 Commercial Message, Japanese abbreviation using Latin script
 Condition monitoring, the process of monitoring a parameter of condition in machinery
 Construction morphology, a theory of linguistic morphology

Organizations 
 Canadian Imperial Bank of Commerce (TSX/NYSE: CM), a Canadian bank
 CM (commerce), a mobile services company formerly called ClubMessage
 Cooler Master, a Taiwan computer hardware manufacturer

Places 
 Cameroon, which has the ISO and FIPS country code "CM"
 .cm, the country code top-level domain for Cameroon
 CM postcode area, central Essex, England
 Chiang Mai, Thailand
 Northern Mariana Islands, formerly with the U.S. postal code "CM" (now "MP" to avoid confusion with Cameroon)

Titles and awards 
 Candidate Master, an international chess title
 Certified Manager, an internationally recognized professional credential for managers and leaders 
 Certified Midwife, health care profession
 Chaconia Medal of the Order of the Trinity, a national award of Trinidad and Tobago, post-nominal CM
 Chief Minister, an appointed head of government. 
 Order of Canada Member, post-nominal letters C.M.
 Congregation of the Mission, a Roman Catholic religious institute
 Construction mechanic (United States Navy), a Seabee occupational rating in the U.S. Navy
 Knight Commander Royal Order of Monisaraphon, post-nominal letters CM

Transportation
 Chemins de fer du Morbihan, a metre gauge railway network in Brittany, France
 CM Airlines, a domestic airline in Honduras
 Copa Airlines, Panama City, Panama, IATA designator

Other uses
 CM, number 900 in Roman numerals
 Construction management/Construction manager
 Contract manufacturer, a company that manufactures items for other companies
 Contribution margin, a measure in management accounting
 Cypro-Minoan syllabary, a form of writing used in Cyprus during the Late Bronze Age
 Central midfielder, a position in association football

See also
 CM&, a Colombian TV production company